Lina AbiRafeh is an Arab-American feminist activist and author who works gender issues in development and humanitarian contexts. She has worked for various United Nations agencies and international non-governmental organizations and was the executive director of the Arab Institute for Women at the Lebanese American University.

She is the author of Gender and International Aid in Afghanistan.

Early life and education 
AbiRafeh was born to a Palestinian pharmacist mother and a Lebanese father and spent time in Saudia Arabia while growing up.

AbiRafeh has a masters degree in international economics and development from the Johns Hopkins University.

She completed her PhD at the London School of Economics and Political Science in 2008, her thesis focusing on gender based violence in humanitarian aid in conflict and post-conflict zones.

Career 
AbiRafeh has worked with various United Nations and humanitarian organizations in Afghanistan, Central African Republic, the Democratic Republic of the Congo, Haiti, Lebanon, Nepal, and Papua New Guinea. For seven years, starting in 2015, she was the executive director of the Arab Institute for Women at the Lebanese American University.

She has critiqued western obsession with how Afghan women dress. She has also critiqued the humanitarian aid system for neglecting the needs of men and drawn links between that neglect and increased rates of gender based violence in Afghanistan.

Awards 
In 2019 she was identified by Apolitical Group as one of the top most influential people in gender equity policy.

Selected publications 

 Lina AbiRafeh, Gender and International Aid in Afghanistan: The Politics and Effects of Intervention, 2009. ISBN 978-0786445196
Lina AbiRafeh, Freedom on the Frontlines: Afghan Women and the Fallacy of Liberation, 2022, ISBN 978-1476689425
Lina AbiRafeh, Lessons from Gender-focused International Aid in Post-Conflict Afghanistan...Learned?, 2005,  ISBN 3-89892-413-0
Lina AbiRafeh, Freedom is Only Won From the Inside: Domestic Violence in Post-Conflict Afghanistan, 2006, The Peaceful Families Project

References

External links 

 Official website

Living people
Year of birth missing (living people)
Lebanese feminists
Alumni of the London School of Economics
Johns Hopkins University alumni
21st-century Lebanese writers
Gender studies academics